A houppelande or houpelande is an outer garment, with a long, full body and flaring sleeves, that was worn by both men and women in Europe in the late Middle Ages. Sometimes the houppelande was lined with fur. The garment was later worn by professional classes, and has remained in Western civilization as the familiar academic and legal robes of today.

The houppelande appeared around 1360 and was to remain fashionable well into the next century. It had its origins in the herigaut, a similar 13th-century garment with hanging sleeves. The edges of the houppelande were often dagged, or cut into decorative patterns such as scallops, "embattled" tabs or even leaf shapes.

History
The term houppelande is of French origin; in England it was called a goun, a term of mockery, and in Italy, a pellanda. It is first mentioned in French royal inventories in 1359 and is thought to have originated as a man's housecoat worn over the pourpoint.

The woman's and man's houppelande were similar in that both featured flared sleeves, high collars and voluminous skirts. However, there were a few key differences. The man's houppelande was belted at the waist, whereas the woman's was belted beneath the bust. Unlike the woman's houppelande, which was always floor-length, the man's houppelande could be of any length. Some men wore houppelandes that extended only as far as the buttocks, prompting critics to claim that they looked like women from behind. Longer versions were mostly worn on ceremonial occasions. A mid-calf version known as the houppelande à mi-jambe gained popularity in the 1400s.

Gallery

See also

1300–1400 in European fashion
1400–1500 in European fashion

Notes

References
Ribiero, Aileen, Dress and Morality, Batsford, 1986, reprinted Berg, 2003, 
Laver, James: The Concise History of Costume and Fashion, Abrams, 1979.

14th-century fashion
15th-century fashion
Medieval European costume
Robes and cloaks
Gowns
History of clothing (Western fashion)